is a Japanese actress.

Filmography

Movies
  (1966)
  (1973)
  (1973)
  (1974)
  (1974)
  (1976)
  (1976)
  (1978)

TV Dramas
  (1970 NHK) as Yaku Hiroko
 
  (1973)
 
  (1986 TBS)
 
  (1997 TBS)

References

External links
Japanese Wikipedia (also main source)

由美かおる at JMDB (in Japanese)

1950 births
Living people
Japanese actresses